Ireland participated in the Junior Eurovision Song Contest 2016 which took place on 20 November 2016, in Valletta, Malta. The Irish broadcaster TG4 was responsible for organising their entry for the contest through a national selection show entitled Junior Eurovision Éire. The national final took place on 6 November 2016, while the semi-finals took place between 9–30 October. This was Ireland's second appearance at the Junior Eurovision Song Contest.

On 6 November, Zena Donnelly was selected to represent Ireland with a song she composed herself, "Brice ar Bhrice" (Brick by Brick). She placed 10th with 122 points.

Background

TG4 previously attempted to participate at the Junior Eurovision Song Contest 2014, but required funding from the Broadcasting Authority of Ireland (BAI), which was rejected.

Before Junior Eurovision
The Irish broadcaster announced on 5 April 2016, that they would be participating at Junior Eurovision for the second time in their history. The mechanism for selecting their entrant and song was through the national selection show Junior Eurovision Éire. The selection process took place every Sunday starting on 9 October, in which thirty-two participants competed, and culminated into a final which was held on 6 November 2016.

Jury members
TG4 published details on the names of the professional jury who would determine the winner of the Junior Eurovision Éire 2016 and the representative for Ireland at the 2016 contest in November. They had all represented Ireland in the Eurovision Song Contest at least once in their careers.

The judging panel consisted of Fiachna Ó Braonáin and Paulien Scanlon, as well as a different guest judge each week.

Junior Eurovision Éire

Semi-final 1
The first semi-final took place on 9 October 2016, in which Jedward were the guest judges.

Hannah McNicholas Roche and Walter McCabe both advanced to the final duel stage and performed their songs for the second time. After their second performances, the jury members selected Walter McCabe as the winner of semi-final 1 and advances to the grand final on 6 November 2016.

Semi-final 2
The second semi-final took place on 16 October 2016, in which Dustin the Turkey was the guest judge.

Zena Donnelly and Daniel Gallagher advanced to the final duel where they performed their songs a second time. After their second performances, Donnelly was selected by the jury to advance to the final.

Semi-final 3
The third semi-final took place on 23 October 2016, in which Sandie Jones was the guest judge.

Rachel Haughney and Cliona NicDhomnail advanced to the final duel where they performed their songs the second time. After their second performances, NicDhomnail was selected by the jury to advance to the final.

Semi-final 4
The fourth semi-final took place on 30 October 2016, in which Niamh Kavanagh was the guest judge.

Lasairfhíona de Brún and Amy McGrath advanced to the final duel where they performed their songs a second time. After their second performances, McGrath was selected by the jury to advance to the final.

Final
The grand final took place on 6 November 2016, in which Linda Martin was the guest judge. Two wildcard acts were entered into the final. They were Hannah McNicholas Roche who came second in week 1 and Lasairfhíona de Brún who came second in week 4.

Final Duel 

For the final, a sing-off was introduced between the top two contenders.

Artist and song information

Zena Donnelly
Zena Donnelly (born 28 August 2002) is an Irish singer. She represented Ireland at the Junior Eurovision Song Contest 2016 in Valletta, Malta on 20 November 2016 with the song "Bríce ar Bhríce".

Zena has won RTÉ's nationwide TV talent competition Show Off or Get Off, performed for Music Inc., and played the lead role in Annie at the National Concert Hall. Zena was a special young guest at the Cheerios ChildLine Concert in the 3Arena alongside other artists including Olly Murs, Boyzone and McBusted. Zena also took part in Junior Eurovision Éire in 2015, coming second to Aimee Banks.

Branching out from music, Zena has started to be cast in films such as The Food Guide To Love, Céad Ghrá, Cuckoo, Dance Emergency and A Christmas Star, where she also sings, among others, the theme song, "We Can Shine".

In 2017, Zena took part in series 1 of The Voice Kids, where she was placed in judge Pixie Lott's team.

Bríce ar Bhríce
"Bríce ar Bhríce" (English translation: "Brick by brick") is a song written and recorded by Irish singer Zena Donnelly. It represented Ireland during the Junior Eurovision Song Contest 2016, placing tenth out of seventeen contestants.

At Junior Eurovision 
During the opening ceremony and the running order draw which took place on 14 November 2016, Ireland was drawn to open the show on 20 November 2016, preceding Armenia.

The final was broadcast in Ireland on TG4. However it was announced on 16 November 2016 by the broadcaster that the show would not be broadcast live but that the show would be broadcast 3 hours and 30 minutes after it aired in Malta.

Final
Zena delivered a strong series of run-throughs of her mid-tempo song against a visually stunning backdrop of the night sky.

Voting
During the press conference for the Junior Eurovision Song Contest 2016, held in Stockholm, the Reference Group announced several changes to the voting format for the 2016 contest. Previously, points had been awarded based on a combination of 50% National juries and 50% televoting, with one more set of points also given out by a 'Kids' Jury'. For the first time since the inauguration of the contest the voting procedure did not include a public televote. Following these results, three expert jurors also announced their points from 1–8, 10, and 12. These professional jurors are: Christer Björkman, Mads Grimstad, and Jedward.

At the end of the voting, Ireland placed 10th with 122 points, receiving 65 points from the adult jury and 57 from the kids jury. Ireland received 2 sets of 12 points, from Italy and Malta.

References

Junior Eurovision Song Contest
Ireland
2016